Torsten Tegnér (6 December 1888 – 10 June 1977) was a Swedish athlete and journalist, son of composer Alice Tegnér. He was owner of the sports magazine Idrottsbladet between 1915 and 1957. He continued to edit the magazine until 1967.

References

External links

1888 births
1977 deaths
AIK Bandy players
Swedish bandy players
Swedish ice hockey players
Swedish orienteers
Swedish male racewalkers